Song of Tomorrow is a 1967 Hong Kong drama film written and directed by Doe Ching, based on Fang Lung-hsiang's novel of the same name. The story is about a woman's struggle to set her love free from substance dependence.

Plot
After her father's death, Su Ling (Ivy Ling Po) struggles to support her ill mother and disabled brother, but Mr. Su's former student Chiang Sung-ping (Chiao Chuang), a virtuoso drummer, does everything to help them. With Chiang's help, Su Ling becomes a skilled singer and performs in nightclub with him. They fall in love, but one day Su learns that Chiang is dependent on a drug to help him focus. Chiang promises that he would quit, but soon Su finds out otherwise and breaks up with him. Later, after listening to Chiang's explanation, Su realizes how they love each other and is determined to help him recover from the drug addiction. They get married and go to a resort for their honeymoon. Everything is blissful, but the possibility of her husband smoking the substance again is always in the back of Su's mind.

Cast 
This is a partial list of cast. 
 Ivy Ling Po - Su Ling
 Kiu Chong	- Jiang Song Ping
 Chin Han - Yu Ming
 Shen Yi - Bai Lu
 Lui Ming - David Zhu
 Chen Hung-Lieh - Xiao Ding
 Tien Shun - Manager Chan
 Ma Hsiao-Nung - Ling's mother

References

External links

 Song of Tomorrow at senscritique.com

Hong Kong drama films
1960s Mandarin-language films